Tom Stafford is an American astronomer who has discovered a number of asteroids since 1997, including 12061 Alena, 12533 Edmond, 13436 Enid, 13688 Oklahoma and 15904 Halstead at Zeno Observatory (observatory code 727) in Edmond, Oklahoma. He is the son of Joseph W. Stafford and Alena Ruth Robbins, both now deceased, and has a sister, Susan Halstead.

References 

Year of birth missing (living people)
Living people
American astronomers
Discoverers of asteroids
People from Edmond, Oklahoma